Toomsuba Creek is a stream in the U.S. states of Alabama and Mississippi.

Toomsuba is a name derived from the Choctaw language purported to mean either (sources vary) "blue pigeon hawk" or "fish hawk". Variant names are "Tonsabah Creek", "Tonsobah Creek", "Tonsubah Creek", "Toomseba Creek", "Toomsebah Creek", and "Toomsooba Creek".

References

Rivers of Mississippi
Rivers of Sumter County, Alabama
Rivers of Lauderdale County, Mississippi
Rivers of Alabama
Alabama placenames of Native American origin
Mississippi placenames of Native American origin